L'amour en vol is the third studio album by the pop artist Leslie Bourgoin. It was released in 2006 through Sony BMG.

Track listing
"Je le ferai pour toi"
"L'Envers de la Terre"
"Capitales riches"
"Accorde-moi" (feat. Bobby Valentino)
"Un Pas vers l'amour"
"S'échapper"
"Sobri 2" (feat. Amine)
"L'Amour en vol"
"Echanger nos vies"
"Cherish"
"Maman"
"Vers le Paradis"
"Si le temps"
"Je veux être"
"Ce qu'il y a entre nous"
 Ouragan (hidden track, cover of Ouragan by Stéphanie de Monaco)

Charts

References

2006 albums
Leslie (singer) albums